Schwerz is a village and a former municipality in the district Saalekreis, in Saxony-Anhalt, Germany. Since 1 January 2010, it is part of the town Landsberg.

Former municipalities in Saxony-Anhalt
Landsberg, Saxony-Anhalt